This is a list of railroads operating in the U.S. state of Florida.

Current railroads

Common freight carriers
 Alabama and Gulf Coast Railway (AGR)
 AN Railway (AN)
 Bay Line Railroad (BAYL)
 CSX Transportation (CSXT)
 First Coast Railroad (FCRD)
 Florida Central Railroad (FCEN)
 Florida East Coast Railway (FEC)
 Florida Gulf & Atlantic Railroad (FGA)
 Florida Midland Railroad (FMID)
 Florida Northern Railroad (FNOR)
 Georgia and Florida Railway (GFRR)
 Jacksonville Port Terminal Railroad (JXPT)
 Norfolk Southern Railway (NS) through subsidiary Georgia Southern and Florida Railway (GSF)
 Seminole Gulf Railway (SGLR)
 South Central Florida Express, Inc. (SCXF)

Private freight carriers
 CF Industries (CFIZ)
 Conrad Yelvington Distributors, Inc. (CNYX)
 The Mosaic Company (IMCX)
 Orlando Utilities Commission (OUCX)
 Perdue Farms (PFMX)
 Port Manatee Railroad (MAUP)
 Port of Palm Beach District (PPBD)
 Port of Panama City (PPC)
 United States Sugar Corporation (USCX)

Passenger carriers
 Amtrak (AMTK)
 Brightline (BLFX)
 Florida Railroad Museum (FGCX)
 Gold Coast Railroad Museum (GCOX)
 Jacksonville Skyway
 Miami Metromover and Miami Metrorail
 Orlando & Northwestern Railway (ONWX)
 Seminole Gulf Railway (SGLR)
 Serengeti Express (located in Busch Gardens Tampa)
 SunRail (SRCX)
 Tradewinds & Atlantic Railroad
 TECO Line Streetcar
 Tri-Rail (TRCX)
 Walt Disney World Monorail and Walt Disney World Railroad

Private carriers
 Clay Springs and Apopka Railroad
 Ellaville, West Lake and Jennings Railroad
 Florida and Georgia Railway
 Peace River Phosphate Company
 Pensacola and Andalusia Railroad
 Starke and New River Railroad
 Union Cypress Company
 Winston Lumber Company

Never built
Choctawhatchee and Northern Railroad

Defunct railroads

Notes

References

 
 
Florida
Railroads